Mole Mania, known in Japan as , is a 1996 video game developed by Pax Softnica, and published by Nintendo for the original Game Boy.  It is also one of the least known works of Shigeru Miyamoto. The game was re-released for the Nintendo 3DS Virtual Console in all major regions throughout 2012.

Gameplay 
In the game, Muddy has to move a black ball to a gate at the end of the screen in order to get to the next screen.  He can push, pull, and throw the black ball. Muddy can also dig into soft ground to find underground paths around obstacles. Choosing where to dig is a crucial element of the game's various puzzles, as creating holes in the wrong areas could hinder the player's efforts to advance. Dropping the ball into a hole would cause it to return to its starting point. Given the nature of Muddy's ability to move the ball, digging holes in the wrong places could make reaching the gate with the ball completely impossible, requiring Muddy to leave the screen and then return to try again. Along the way, there are many obstacles, such as moving enemies, pipes, barrels, weights, and bosses.

Characters 

Muddy must find and rescue his wife and seven children by navigating his way through the seven worlds of Jinbe Land; avoiding enemies, solving puzzles, stealing cabbages, and defeating the boss of each world. Freeing his loved ones one by one before coming face-to-face with Jinbe himself.

Jinbe, a cabbage farmer and ruler of Jinbe Land, serves as the main antagonist to Muddy. He is depicted with a Mario-esque appearance and stature, wearing red overalls and a green shirt. His face is obscured by a full beard and he is seen wearing a brimmed gardener's hat.

Jinbe Land is home to a wide variety of enemies sent by Jinbe to intercept Muddy before rescuing his family. These enemies include dinosaurs as well as two unnamed "plumber sons" that Muddy must defeat later in the game.

Reception 

Jason Cipriano of MTV praised the games' short and to-the-point puzzles. 1UP.com had compared the game to Adventures of Lolo when it comes to gameplay.

References

External links 
Official Nintendo web page (Japanese) (Translated with Excite.Co.Jp's translator | Translated with Google's translator)
VG Museum (Screenshots)
Mole Mania at NinDB

Mole Mania at Hardcore Gaming 101

1996 video games
Game Boy games
Nintendo games
Pax Softnica games
Puzzle video games
Video games developed in Japan
Virtual Console games
Virtual Console games for Nintendo 3DS
Fictional moles
Single-player video games